"Ashes to Ashes" is a song by Swedish singer Anna Bergendahl. The song was performed for the first time in Melodifestivalen 2019, where it made it to the final. This is the first song for Bergendahl in Melodifestivalen since winning the competition in 2010.

Charts

References

2019 singles
English-language Swedish songs
Melodifestivalen songs of 2019
Swedish pop songs
Songs written by Thomas G:son
Songs written by Bobby Ljunggren
Songs written by Erik Bernholm